Louis Sonnery-Martin (1841-1907) was a French politician. He served as a member of the Chamber of Deputies from 1893 to 1898, representing Rhône.

References

1841 births
1907 deaths
People from Tarare
Politicians from Auvergne-Rhône-Alpes
Members of the 6th Chamber of Deputies of the French Third Republic